Marwell may refer to:

People 
 David Marwell (born 1951), American historian
 Gerald Marwell (1937–2013), American sociologist
 Marwell Periotti (1939–2004), Argentine footballer

Other uses 
 Marwell (horse), a racehorse
 Marwell College, a former collegiate church in Hampshire, England
 Marwell Zoo, on the estate of Marwell Hall, near Winchester, England